The Igarapés do Juruena State Park is a state park in the state of Mato Grosso, Brazil.

Location

The Igarapés do Juruena State Park is divided between the municipalities of Colniza (44.06%) and Cotriguaçu (55.94%) in the state of Mato Grosso.
The park is bounded to the north by the border with the State of Amazonas and the Sucunduri State Park, Sucunduri State Forest and Aripuanã Sustainable Development Reserve in Amazonas.
The Aripuanã River defines the western boundary and the Juruena River defines the eastern boundary.
The Juruena National Park lies to the east.
The Igarapés do Juruena State Park overlaps by almost 53% with the Juruena National Park.

Environment

The Igarapés do Juruena State Park is in the Amazon biome.
Vegetation is about 45% dense rain forest and more than 18% contact between savanna and seasonal forest.

History

The Igarapés do Juruena State Park was created by decree 5.438 of 12 November 2002.
The consultative council was created on 13 February 2007, and the management plan was approved on 13 February 2009.
The members of the consultative council were defined on 17 December 2014.
The conservation unit is supported by the Amazon Region Protected Areas Program.

In 2014 the federal government was considering a proposal to declare the Juruena National Park an area of public utility in preparation for constructing two hydroelectric dams in the site, the São Simão Alto and Salto Augusto Baixo.
The planned dams had a forecast capacity of 4,940 MW.
The National Council for Energy Policy (CNPE) had two seats for civil society members, but these had not been filled.
In September 2014 the federal government withdrew its proposal.
The dams would have flooded parts of the Juruena National Park, Igarapés do Juruena State Park and the Escondido and Apiaká do Pontal indigenous territories in Mato Grosso, and would have affected part of the Sucunduri State Park in Amazonas and other indigenous territories.

Notes

Sources

State parks of Brazil
Protected areas of Mato Grosso
Protected areas established in 2002
2002 establishments in Brazil